Rouge is the fourth international studio album by Malaysian singer-songwriter Yuna. The album, which saw her collaborate with many international acts, was released on July 12, 2019, by labels Verve Forecast Records and Universal Music Group. Five songs in the album were released as singles. Rouge, Yuna's seventh album overall, was recorded between 2017 and 2019.

Background
The album took two years to complete. According to Yuna in an exclusive interview with the Malaysian tabloid newspaper, Kosmo!: "It took me two years to produce this album. That's true, it took a while to produce a studio album. But that is because I work with different producers".

On May 17, 2019, Yuna announced the official release of Rouge on her personal Instagram account, the album cover depicts Yuna in a red dress and a bunny cross on her head. In an interview, she disclosed that the album title was French for "red" which signifies love, spirit and strength. Yuna choose the title to reflect the bolder she is. In an interview with Billboard, she said: "I’ve always felt like red is such a bold colour and I felt like, ‘Oh, maybe it’s not for me.’ Even the colour, the lipstick colour is maybe not for me. That's always been the person that I am". The cover photography was captured by Steven Taylor.

Tour
To promote Rouge, Yuna embark her US tour, which took place in Chicago on 14 July followed by Washington, New York City, Boston dan Los Angeles and the last stop in Oakland on 2 August.

Singles
The first single to be released in the album is "Forevermore" on April 5, 2019. Its music video, directed by Yuna's husband, Adam Sinclair, in which revolves around her ode to Malaysia, where she was born and raised as well as showcasing the beauty of Malaysia. On May 16, the second single "Blank Marquee", featuring G-Eazy was released, with music video filmed in Kuala Lumpur, featuring actor Amerul Affendi and US-based Malaysian supermodel, Atikah Karim. The video, also directed by Sinclair. The third single, "Pink Youth" features English rapper Little Simz was released on June 30, with futuristic-themed music video directed by Esteban Valdez (who also wrote and edited the video), while its story and concept by Yuna and Sinclair. "(Not) The Love of My Life", the fourth single from the album, was released on August 22, with Bollywood-themed music video was directed by Yuna herself. The fifth and last single from the album, "Castaway", featuring Tyler, the Creator was released on October 16.

Critical reception
Rouge received generally positive reviews from critics. Chris Malone Méndez from Forbes wrote that "Rouge serves as Yuna's most dynamic record to date, and should excite fans both new and old about what to expect from her next" and felt that most of the album tracklist is "filled with after-hours R&B that Yuna has become known for on her previous projects". Adriane Pontecorvo from PopMatters said, “Rouge is, in some ways, a redefinition of what it means to be a worldwide star. The same factors that make it unique, also make it the epitome of successful pop music; it's easy to listen to and deliberately engaging of audiences everywhere." Kayleigh O'Malley from Eleven PDX called the album as "a summer album for the brokenhearted". Skylar de Paul from The Daily Californian described the album as "full of energy, war, strength, determination, passion, and basically every other characteristic tied to the connotations”. Symphreona Clark from YR noted that the album "combines pop with a modern-day take on disco, creating a luminescent piece that is both coherent and fun". Rouge got a 6.8 from Pitchfork review.

Track listing

Credits and personnel
Credits taken from the album's liner notes.

Personnel
 Yuna - vocals
 Tyler, the Creator - vocals
 G-Eazy - vocals
 Little Simz - vocals
 Kyle - vocals
 Jay Park - vocals
 Miyavi - guitar
 Masego - background vocals, saxophone
 Robin Hannibal - background vocals, keyboards, organ, synthesizers, bass, guitar, kalimba, drums, percussion
 Brooke de la Rosa - background vocals
 Cardiak - piano, drums
 August Rosenbaum - piano
 Julian-Quan Viet Le - keyboards
 Joel van Dijk - guitars
 Danny McKinnon - guitars
 Thomas Drayton - bass
 Todd Simon - trumpet
 Ibrahim Maalouf - trumpet
 Simon Huber - cello
 Ginny Luke - violin

Technicals
 Arrangements by Robin Hannibal
 Additional arrangements by August Rosenbaum (track 11)
 Vocals recorded by Davey Donaldson at Independently Popular and Robin Hannibal at Hannibal's House
 Additional recording by Joshua Sellers, Josh Flores and Thomas Cullison at Chalice Studios (track 10)
 Additional recording by Fisticuffs and Christian Plata (track 8)
 Instrumentation recorded at Hannibal's Room
 Additional instrumentation recorded by J.LBS at 10603 Studios (track 4)
 Additional piano recorded by Chris Tabron at Red Bull Studios (track 11)
 Vocal production by Robin Hannibal
 Additional vocal production by Rex Rideout (tracks 1, 3 & 4-8)
 Additional vocal production by Robert Castillo (tracks 2 & 3)
 Mixed by Stan Greene at Arketek Studios (tracks 1, 3-8 & 11) and Eric Madrid at Sonic Element Studios (tracks 2, 9 & 10)
 Assistant mixed by William Binderup
 Mastered by Chris Gehringer at Sterling Sound, New York
 All tracks produced by Robin Hannibal except "Likes" co-produced by Cardiak, "Teenage Heartbreak" produced by J.LBS and "Amy" by Fisticuffs.
 Robbin Hannibal & Benjamin Willis - executive producer
 Indie-Pop - management
 Dahlia Ambach-Chaplin & Benjamin Willis - A&R
 Natalie Weber - A&R manager
 Melody Ewing & Femi Onafowokan - A&R administration
 Adam Lekach - marketing
 Tom Arndt - production
 Julie Johantgen - release coordination
 Yunalis Zara'ai & KyleDidThis - creative direction
 Steven Taylor - photography
 Jacob Lerman - design

Charts

Release history

References

External links
 Rouge on yunazarai.com

2019 albums
Yuna (singer) albums
Verve Forecast Records albums
Universal Music Group albums